Fanny Rozet (1881–1958; née Stéphanie Amélie Mismaque), was a French sculptor. She was known for her Art Deco sculptures, decorative objects, and lamps. She was the first female student to attend L’École Nationale Supérieure des Beaux-Arts de Paris (ENSBA).

Biography 

She was born on 13 June 1881, in Paris, Île-de-France, France. Her father was the sculptor René Rozet, who married her mother in 1895, four years after her birth. 

Rozet was a member of the Union of Women Painters and Sculptors (UFPS). The UFPS demanded L’École Nationale Supérieure des Beaux-Arts de Paris (ENSBA; also known simply as Beaux-Arts de Paris) to allow Rozet to attend, because during this time women were not allowed entrance to the school. Rozet was the first female student to attend ENSBA in 1896, and there she studied under Laurent Marqueste. 

Starting in 1904, she began exhibiting at Salon des Artistes Français. In 1905, she was accepted on a trial basis for the Prix de Rome (an organization which also did not have many female participants), however she did not go beyond the "preparatory examination".

Rozet created Art Deco statuettes, decorative objects, and lamps.

She died on 9 March 1958, in Versailles, Yvelines, Île-de-France, France. 

The north wing in "La Casa Grande" at Hearst Castle contained on display a Rozet silvered bronze lamp, Cupid Jailed (c. 1920).

References 

1881 deaths
1958 deaths
Artists from Paris
20th-century French sculptors
French women sculptors
20th-century French women artists
École des Beaux-Arts alumni